Stockton North is a constituency covering the town of Stockton-on-Tees in County Durham and other nearby settlements in the Borough of Stockton-on-Tees located north of the River Tees, represented in the House of Commons of the UK Parliament since 2010 by Alex Cunningham, a member of the Labour Party.  In November 2021, Mr Cunningham announced his intention to retire at the next general election.

Boundaries 

1983–1997: The Borough of Stockton-on-Tees wards of Blue Hall, Charltons, Elm Tree, Glebe, Grange, Hardwick, Marsh House, Mile House, Newtown, Northfield, Norton, Portrack and Tilery, Roseworth, St Aidan's, St Cuthbert's, Whitton, and Wolveston.

1997–2010: The Borough of Stockton-on-Tees wards of Blue Hall, Charltons, Glebe, Grange, Hardwick, Marsh House, Mile House, Newtown, Northfield, Norton, Portrack and Tilery, Roseworth, St Aidan's, St Cuthbert's, Whitton, and Wolviston.

2010–present: The Borough of Stockton-on-Tees wards of Billingham Central, Billingham East, Billingham North, Billingham South, Billingham West, Hardwick, Newtown, Northern Parishes, Norton North, Norton South, Norton West, Roseworth, Stockton Town Centre, and Western Parishes.

Stockton North consists of the north-eastern part of Stockton-on-Tees in County Durham and the nearby towns and villages of Billingham, Wolviston, Port Clarence and Thorpe Thewles.

History 
The constituency was created for the 1983 general election, partially replacing the former Stockton-on-Tees constituency. The outgoing MP for Stockton-on-Tees was Bill Rodgers, who had held the seat since 1962. He had been a Labour Party member until 1981, when he left to found the Social Democratic Party (SDP).

The 1983 election was the first since Rodgers had left the Labour Party, and he was narrowly defeated by Labour's Frank Cook. Cook held the seat with majorities between 16% and 48% until the 2010 general election, when after 27 years as the MP he was de-selected by his local party.  Cook chose to run again however, as an independent candidate. Cook polled less than 5% of the vote, fifth of the seven candidates who stood, and joined four of these in forfeiting his deposit and the seat was held by the Labour Party's next candidate, Alex Cunningham.

Constituency profile
The town of Stockton-on-Tees is a significant exports manufacturing and processing base in the United Kingdom.  Stockton North has often in economically troubled times significantly more unemployment than Stockton South: workless claimants, registered jobseekers,  were in November 2012 significantly above the national average of 3.8%, at 7.0% of the population based on a statistical compilation by The Guardian compared to 4.5% in Stockton South.

Members of Parliament

Elections

Elections in the 2010s

Elections in the 2000s

Elections in the 1990s

Elections in the 1980s

See also 
 Stockton-on-Tees, approximate predecessor, abolished 1983.
 List of parliamentary constituencies in Cleveland
 History of parliamentary constituencies and boundaries in Cleveland

Notes

References

Sources
Election result, 2005 (BBC)
Election results, 1997 – 2001 (BBC)
Election results, 1997 – 2005  (Election Demon)
Election results, 1983 – 1992  (Election Demon)
Election results, 1992 – 2005 (Guardian)

Politics of the Borough of Stockton-on-Tees
Parliamentary constituencies in North East England
Parliamentary constituencies in County Durham
Constituencies of the Parliament of the United Kingdom established in 1983